Lorenzo Pavia (died 1764) was an Italian painter of the Baroque period, active in his native Bologna, but also successively in Mantua and Verona, where he died. He painted quadratura.

References

Year of birth unknown
1764 deaths
18th-century Italian painters
Italian male painters
Painters from Bologna
Quadratura painters
18th-century Italian male artists